Daniel Lockwood may refer to:

 Daniel N. Lockwood (1844–1906), American lawyer and politician